Wayne Robert Hoffman (December 13, 1917 – April 13, 2005) was a U.S. American football running back in the NFL for the Washington Redskins and Los Angeles Rams. He also played in the All-America Football Conference for the Los Angeles Dons and in the Pacific Coast Professional Football League for the Hollywood Bears. Hoffman was an All-American college football player at the University of Southern California and was drafted in the ninth round of the 1940 NFL Draft.

College career
Hoffman played for USC as a 3-year (1937–39) letterman, he was USC's top receiver in 1938 and played in the College All-Star Game in 1939. USC went 9-2 in 1938 and in 1939, the Trojans went 8-0-2. Hoffman and the Trojans won the Rose Ball in 1938 and 1939 against Duke and Tennessee respectively. One of Hoffman’s greatest highlights was when he tackled a UCLA player at the goal line to preserve a trip to the rose bowl.

References

1917 births
2005 deaths
American football running backs
Washington Redskins players
Los Angeles Rams players
Los Angeles Dons players
Players of American football from West Virginia
USC Trojans football players
Sportspeople from Morgantown, West Virginia
People from Monongalia County, West Virginia